Deuchler is a surname. Notable people with the surname include:

Martina Deuchler (born 1935), Swiss academic and author
Suzanne Deuchler (1929–2022), American politician

See also
Deschler